Herbert is an outer rural locality of Darwin. It is 44 km South - east of Darwin.  Its Local Government Area is the Litchfield Municipality. The suburb is mostly a rural area. It is situated in the vicinity of Benham and Benjamin Lagoons. It was previously considered as part of Humpty Doo.

References

Suburbs of Darwin, Northern Territory